Saragulovo (Harığul) is a rural locality (a village) in Dushanbekovsky Selsoviet, Kiginsky District, Bashkortostan, Russia. The population was 86 as of 2010. There are 2 streets.

Geography 
Saragulovo is located 15 km north of Verkhniye Kigi (the district's administrative centre) by road. Tukayevo is the nearest rural locality.

References 

Rural localities in Kiginsky District